Tecoma castanifolia is a species of flowering plant native to Ecuador and Peru. Unlike some other Tecoma species, the leaves are simple.

References

castanifolia
Flora of South America
Garden plants